Via Devana is the name given to a Roman Road in England that ran from Colchester in the south-east, through Cambridge in the interior, and on to Chester in the north-west. These were important Roman military centres and it is conjectured that the main reason the road was constructed was military rather than civilian. The Latin name for Chester is Deva and 'Via Devana' is thus 'The Chester Road'. Colchester was Colonia Victricensis, 'the City of Victory', and lays claim to be the oldest Roman city in Britain. The Via Devana had little civilian rationale and the road eventually fell into disuse as it was not possible to maintain extensive public works following withdrawal of the last Roman legion from Britain in 407. As a result, its route is difficult to find today, especially in its more northern reaches. It is omitted from some historians' maps for this reason but most nowadays accept its existence. The undocumented name Via Devana was coined by Charles Mason, D.D., of Trinity College, Cambridge, who was also rector of Orwell, Cambridgeshire, and Woodwardian Professor of Fossils at Cambridge University from 1734. During his life, Mason compiled a complete map of Cambridgeshire which was later published in 1808, long after his death.

Route

Its route ran north and west as follows:

 Colchester - Colonia Victricensis
 Wixoe (conjectured) - (possible fort)
 Cambridge - (Latin name: Cantabrigia. Roman Name: Durolipons or Duroliponte), now the main road through Cambridge from the station to Madgalene Bridge 
 Huntingdon / Godmanchester (Durolipus or Durovigutum) where it crossed Ermine Street
 Corby
 Medbourne - The stretch from Medbourne to Leicester is broken, but where it exists is nowadays known as  the "Gartree Road" and "Evington Footway"
 Leicester- (Ratae Corieltauvorum), meeting Fosse Way
There is speculation that finds in Moira indicates the Mason's route, reported in 1831, may have some factual basis.
 Mancetter (Manduessedum) where it joined Watling Street until
 Water Eaton - (Pennocrucium) to
 Newport, Shropshire - (Plesc which meant fortified place or one with palisade) it is here that it followed the same route as the A41 towards
 Whitchurch, Shropshire - (Mediolan or Mediolanum)
 Chester

See also
Roman roads in Britain

References

External links
Via Devana in Leicestershire

Devana, Via
Newport, Shropshire
Archaeological sites in Essex
Archaeological sites in Cheshire
Archaeological sites in Shropshire